Warren County is a county located in the eastern portion of the U.S. state of Missouri. As of the 2010 census, the population was 32,513. The county is located on the north side of the Missouri River. Its county seat is Warrenton. The county was established on January 5, 1833 and was named for General Joseph Warren, who died in the Battle of Bunker Hill during the American Revolutionary War.

Warren County is part of the St. Louis, MO-IL Metropolitan Statistical Area. The county is traversed by Route 94, called the "Missouri Weinstrasse" because of the many vineyards from Marthasville east into St. Charles County. Warren County is also part of the Missouri Rhineland, with award-winning wineries located on both sides of the Missouri River.

Geography

Adjacent counties
Lincoln County (north)
St. Charles County (east)
Franklin County (south)
Gasconade County (southwest)
Montgomery County (west)

Major highways
 Interstate 70
 U.S. Route 40
 Route 47
 Route 94

Demographics

As of the census of 2000, there were 24,525 people, 9,185 households, and 6,888 families residing in the county. There were 11,046 housing units at an average density of 26 per square mile (10/km2). The racial makeup of the county was 95.89% White, 1.94% Black or African American, 0.45% Native American, 0.24% Asian, 0.02% Pacific Islander, 0.44% from other races, and 1.02% from two or more races. Approximately 1.28% of the population were Hispanic or Latino of any race. Among the major ancestries reported in Warren County were 41.4% German, 13.8% American, 10.2% Irish and 7.0% English ancestry.

There were 9,185 households, out of which 34.70% had children under the age of 18 living with them, 62.20% were married couples living together, 8.90% had a female householder with no husband present, and 25.00% were non-families. 20.80% of all households were made up of individuals, and 8.80% had someone living alone who was 65 years of age or older. The average household size was 2.64 and the average family size was 3.05.

In the county, the population was spread out, with 26.90% under the age of 18, 7.60% from 18 to 24, 28.80% from 25 to 44, 23.70% from 45 to 64, and 13.00% who were 65 years of age or older. The median age was 37 years. For every 100 females there were 98.60 males. For every 100 females age 18 and over, there were 96.10 males.

The median income for a household in the county was $41,016, and the median income for a family was $46,863. Males had a median income of $36,315 versus $23,443 for females. The per capita income for the county was $19,690. About 6.40% of families and 8.60% of the population were below the poverty line, including 10.50% of those under age 18 and 10.40% of those age 65 or over.

2020 Census

Politics

Local
All of the elected positions in the county are held by Republicans.

State

Warren County is divided into two legislative districts in the Missouri House of Representatives, both of which are held by Republicans.

District 42 — Bart Korman (R-High Hill). Consists of most of the entire county, including the communities of Marthasville, Pendeleton, Truesdale, and Warrenton.

There were no incumbents in this race. 

District 63 — Bryan Spencer (R-Wentzville). Consists of the communities of Foristell, Innsbrook, and Wright City.

Warren County is a part of Missouri's 10th District in the Missouri Senate and is currently represented by Jeanie Riddle (R-Fulton). The 10th Senatorial District consists of all of Audrain, Callaway, Lincoln, Monroe, Montgomery, and Warren counties.

Federal

Warren County is included in Missouri's 3rd Congressional District and is represented by Blaine Luetkemeyer (R-St. Elizabeth) in the U.S. House of Representatives.

Political culture

At the presidential level, like many exurban counties, Warren County tends to lean Republican. Bill Clinton in 1992 is the solitary Democratic presidential nominee to carry Warren County since Stephen Douglas in 1860, and Clinton only won with 37.1 percent of the vote.

Like most rural and exurban areas throughout Northeast Missouri, voters in Warren County generally adhere to socially and culturally conservative principles which tend to influence their Republican leanings. The initiative narrowly passed the state with 51 percent of support from voters as Missouri became one of the first states in the nation to approve embryonic stem cell research. Despite Warren County's longstanding tradition of supporting socially conservative platforms, voters in the county have a penchant for advancing populist causes like increasing the minimum wage. In 2006, Missourians voted on a proposition (Proposition B) to increase the minimum wage in the state to $6.50 an hour—it passed Warren County with 77.48 percent of the vote. The proposition strongly passed every single county in Missouri with 78.99 percent voting in favor. (During the same election, voters in five other states also strongly approved increases in the minimum wage.)

Missouri presidential preference primary (2008)

Former U.S. Senator Hillary Rodham Clinton (D-New York) received more votes, a total of 1,971, than any candidate from either party in Warren County during the 2008 presidential primary.

Education

Public schools
Warren County R-III School District - Warrenton
Daniel Boone Elementary School (PK-05) 
Warrior Ridge Elementary School (K-05) 
Rebecca Boone Elementary School (K-05) 
Black Hawk Middle School (06-08) 
Warrenton High School (09-12) 
Wright City R-II School District - Wright City 
Wright City East Elementary School (K-01) - Foristell
Wright City Elementary School (02-05) 
Wright City Middle School (06-08) 
Wright City High School (09-12)

Private schools
Holy Rosary School – Warrenton (K-08) – Roman Catholic 
St. Vincent De Paul School – Marthasville (K-08) – Roman Catholic
St. Ignatius Loyola School – Marthasville (PK-08) – Roman Catholic

Public libraries
Warrenton Branch Library

Communities

Cities

Foristell (Partly in Charles County)
Marthasville
Truesdale
Warrenton (county seat)
Wright City

Villages
Innsbrook
Pendleton
Three Creeks

Unincorporated communities

 Bernheimer
 Bridgeport
 Case
 Concord Hill
 Dutzow
 Gore
 Holstein
 Hopewell
 Lippstadt
 Macedonia Neighborhood
 New Truxton
 Peers
 Pin Oak
 Pinckney
 Treloar

Media
KFAV, 99.9 mHz FM station featuring country music, sister station to KWRE
KWRE, 730 kHz AM station featuring country music, sister station to KFAV

See also
National Register of Historic Places listings in Warren County, Missouri

References

External links
 Official site
 Digitized 1930 Plat Book of Warren County  from University of Missouri Division of Special Collections, Archives, and Rare Books

 
Missouri Rhineland
Regions of Greater St. Louis
1833 establishments in Missouri
Populated places established in 1833